Joseph Bernard Clark (1868-1940) was a British ornamental plasterer and co-founder of the specialist plasterwork company of Clark & Fenn. 

Born in Dundee on 25 March 1868, the son of a plasterer, Clark's family moved to London when he was still young. In 1913 Clark joined with Harry Fenn, a surveyor, founding a company at Loughborough Junction to specialise in ornamental fibrous plasterwork and Plaster of Paris work. 
The business was a rapid success with commissions from the new cinemas and major theatres who competed against each other through the splendour of their interior decoration. For designs, Clark & Fenn worked closely with G. Jackson & Sons, founded in 1780 with Robert Adam as a designer.  The company soon moved to larger premises at Clapham Old Town where they were able to prefabricate much of their work off-site. This allowed them to take the mouldings ready-prepared for installation to a theatre or cinema, minimising the disruption to performances and rehearsals. 

Notable works include:
 Theatre Royal, Drury Lane 
 Grand Theatre Leeds
 London Palladium
 Somerset House in the Strand
 St. Clement Danes in the Strand, 
 Granada, Tooting

External links
 Interior photographs of the Granada, Tooting
 G Jackson & Sons George Jackson Limited
 Catalogue of decorative mouldings Clark and Fenn

Sources
Friends of West Norwood cemetery Biography of Joseph Bernard Clark (1868-1940) Master Plasterer

Plasterers
1868 births
1940 deaths
Burials at West Norwood Cemetery
People from Dundee